The Diplomatic Lover is a 1934 British musical romance film directed by Anthony Kimmins and starring Harold French, Tamara Desni and Davy Burnaby.

The film was made at Shepperton Studios as a quota quickie for release by Fox Film. It was adapted from the play Der Frauendiplomat by Curt J. Braun and Bobby E. Lüthge. It is also known by the alternative title How's Chances?.

A young ambitious British diplomat goes to take up his post in an embassy abroad.

Cast 
Harold French as Nottingham
Tamara Desni as Helen
Davy Burnaby as Michelo
Morton Selten as Sir Charles
Reginald Gardiner as Dersingham
Carol Rees as Dolores
Peggy Novak as Olga
Percy Walsh as Castellano
Andreas Malandrinos as Machulla Ahab

See also 
The Ladies Diplomat (1932)

References

External links 

Films directed by Anthony Kimmins
1930s romantic musical films
British romantic musical films
British remakes of German films
Films shot at Shepperton Studios
Quota quickies
British black-and-white films
1930s British films